Baraniha (also Romanized as Bārānīhā; also known as Bārānī and Bālānī) is in Fajr Rural District, in the Central District of Gonbad-e Qabus County, Golestan Province, Iran. At the 2006 census, its population was 253, in 58 families.
Balani is also a surname in the Sindhi Community.

References 

Populated places in Gonbad-e Kavus County